Live In USA 1988/92 is a live album by Richard Marx released by Arriba Records. It includes ten songs from Marx's first three albums that he performed live plus one cover song, "Wonderful World". Each of the songs were performed in different venues.

Track listing
All tracks composed by Richard Marx; except where indicated
 "Should've Known Better" - 5:29
 "Endless Summer Nights" - 5:28
 "Remember Manhattan" (Marx, Fee Waybill) - 5:37
 "Don't Mean Nothing" (Marx, Bruce Gaitsch) - 6:55
 "Keep Coming Back" - 6:43
 "Hazard" - 5:00
 "Right Here Waiting" - 4:15
 "Angelia" - 6:01
 "Hands in Your Pocket" - 4:00
 "Take This Heart" - 4:00
 "Wonderful World" (Sam Cooke, Herb Alpert, Lou Adler) - 3:13

Richard Marx albums
1992 live albums
albums produced by Richard Marx